WALV-FM (95.3 MHz, "ESPN Chattanooga") is a sports formatted radio station licensed to Ooltewah, Tennessee, United States, and serves the Chattanooga area. The station is currently owned by J. L. Brewer Broadcasting of Cleveland, LLC. and airs programming from ESPN Radio.

WALV-FM has their home studio at the Chattanooga offices of Brewer Broadcasting at 1305 Carter Street, along with sister stations Power 94 and Groove 93.  Its transmitter is located in Signal Mountain.

History
The station first signed on as WQNE, a religious format on February 27, 1980. The format used until 1984, when it became an adult contemporary format as WALV, known as "Alive 95". WALV was Chattanooga's dominant affiliate for Rick Dees Weekly Top 40. The adult contemporary format continued throughout the 1980s and the 1990s. By the early-2000s, WALV's adult contemporary format became a hot adult contemporary format.

The "Alive 95" name was used for 22 years in total. The station then carried the Jack FM format ("Playing what we want") from 2006 until May 1, 2009, when it switched to News/Talk using the name "Pulse News", with the Jack FM format relocating to WSAA 93.1. The station was launched as a companion to the Brewer Media-owned alternative weekly newspaper The Chattanooga Pulse and featured longtime radio hosts Dale Deason in the morning and Zach Cooper (who is also the Publisher for the Chattanooga Pulse) in afternoons in its lineup. Former WRCB-TV reporter Louis Lee served as News Director for the entire run of the station.

A year after launching, WPLZ separated itself from the Chattanooga Pulse editorially and changed its slogan to "News Talk 95.3 WPLZ". Among the many hosts who worked on air at the station were Jay "The Jammer" Scott, Bobby Byrd, Max Hackett, Ed Ramsey, Logan Carmichael, Stuart James, and Gary Poole. Among the main syndicated shows carried included Glenn Beck, Clark Howard, Dennis Miller, Jason Lewis, and Phil Hendrie. The station had news affiliations with both Fox News Radio and the Associated Press.

The news department won two Edward R. Murrow awards for its longform coverage of gang issues, and received several honorable mentions for news reporting from the Associated Press. Among the reporters and anchors who worked at the station were Jeremy Lawrence, Misty Brandon, Lysa Greer, Chris Peddie, and Mike Chambers.

In March 2011, Jim Brewer II, station owner, revamped the lineup with Gary Poole and Louis Lee in morning drive, former WGOW-FM host Robert T. Nash in early afternoons and WRCB-TV's David Karnes in afternoon drive. While the station started to show some modest ratings growth, Brewer felt that it wasn't growing fast enough to justify the expense, citing economics and inability to compete with Clear Channel Communications (now iHeartMedia) and Cumulus Broadcasting as the reason. In light of that, the station decided to let the entire staff go effective December 23, 2011.

On January 2, 2012, WPLZ changed their format to country, branded as "Cat Country 95.3", adopting the branding previously used by WQMT.

On June 1, 2015, WPLZ and WPLZ-HD2/W295BI swapped formats—the "Cat Country" format moved to WPLZ-HD2 and W295BI 106.9, while WPLZ's main 95.3 frequency switched to classic hits, branded as "Big 95.3". "Cat Country 106.9" lasted just over five months, as the station began playing Christmas music on November 2, 2015 as "Santa 106.9". On December 28th, WPLZ-HD2 and W295BI flipped to oldies as a spinoff from Big, "106.9 The Big Easy", playing hits from the 50s to 70s. This lasted until November 1, 2016, when WPLZ-HD2 and W295BI switched to Christmas music (again as "Santa 106.9") On December 26, 2016, WPLZ-HD2 and W295BI switched to soft AC, branded as "Easy 106.9".

On September 1, 2021, WPLZ changed their format from classic hits (which continues on WPLZ-HD2/W295BI) to sports, branded as "ESPN Chattanooga" under new WALV-FM call letters (format moved from 105.1 FM, which switched to American Family Radio as WUIE).

WALV-HD4
On April 19, 2017, WPLZ added a news/talk format owned by Hot News Talk LLC. on its HD4 subchannel, and relays to a translator 92.7 (W224AZ) branded as NoogaRadio. The format moved from WSDT 1240 AM Soddy Daisy, whose license was deleted by the FCC in September 2017. It changed to Christmas music In October 2021.

On September 7, 2022 WALV-HD4 changed their format from Christmas music to Spanish CHR, branded as "Tu Radio 92.7".

References

External links

ALV-FM
Sports radio stations in the United States
Radio stations established in 1980
1980 establishments in Tennessee
ESPN Radio stations